The Third Federal Electoral District of Yucatán (III Distrito Electoral Federal de Yucatán) is one of the 300 Electoral Districts into which Mexico is divided for the purpose of elections to the federal Chamber of Deputies and one of five such districts in the state of Yucatán.

It elects one deputy to the lower house of Congress for each three-year legislative period, by means of the first past the post system.

District territory
Under the 2005 districting scheme, the district covers the north-western portion of the municipality of Mérida.

The district's head town (cabecera distrital), where results from individual polling stations are gathered together and collated, is the state capital, the city of Mérida.

Previous districting schemes

1996–2005 district
Between 1996 and 2005,
Yucatán's Third District covered the western portion of the Mérida Municipality.

Deputies returned to Congress from this district

XLVII Legislature
 1967–1970: Víctor Manzanilla Schaffer (PRI)
XLVIII Legislature
 1970–1973:
XLIX Legislature
 1973–1976:
L Legislature
 1976–1979: Víctor Manzanilla Schaffer (PRI)
LI Legislature
 1979–1982: Jorge Jure Cejín (PRI)
LII Legislature
 1982–1985: Rubén Calderón Cecilio (PRI)
LIII Legislature
 1985–1988: Nerio Torres Ortiz (PRI)
LIV Legislature
 1988–1991:
LV Legislature
 1991–1994: José Feliciano Moo y Can (PRI)
LVI Legislature
 1994–1997: Eric Rubio Barthell (PRI)
LVII Legislature
 1997–2000: Fernando Castellanos Pacheco (PAN)
LVIII Legislature
 2000–2003: Silvia López Scoffie (PAN)
LIX Legislature
 2003–2006: José Orlando Pérez Moguel (PAN)
LX Legislature
 2006–2009: Sofía Castro Romero (PAN)
LXI Legislature
 (2009 - 2010): Angélica Araujo Lara (PRI)
 (2010 - 2012): Efraín Aguilar Góngora (PRI)

References and notes

Federal electoral districts of Mexico
Geography of Yucatán